Brandon Michael Barnes (born May 15, 1986) is an American former professional baseball outfielder. He played in Major League Baseball (MLB) for the Houston Astros, Colorado Rockies and Cleveland Indians and in the KBO League for the Hanwha Eagles.

Amateur career
Born in Orange, California, Barnes attended Katella High School in Anaheim, California, where he was a standout in baseball and football. Growing up, Barnes played travel baseball with Minnesota Twins starting pitcher, Phil Hughes, and the pair also played against Mark Trumbo. A talented free safety in football, Barnes did not even play baseball during his senior year at Katella High, and signed a letter of intent to play football at UCLA, but withdrew after a coaching change. Barnes attended Cypress College, a junior college in Cypress, California, where he returned to playing baseball. Despite Cypress being NJCAA, several MLB players have competed for the school's program, including Trevor Hoffman, Ben Francisco, Jason Vargas, and Gerald Laird. Barnes left Cypress to play professional baseball after only one season.

Professional career

Houston Astros
Barnes was called up to the majors for the first time on August 7, 2012.  On May 27, 2013, Barnes hit the Astros first walk off hit of the season.  He hit a ground rule double to deep right field, scoring Ronny Cedeno, as the Astros beat the Colorado Rockies 3 to 2. On July 19, 2013, Barnes hit for the cycle. He also has an inside the park home run.

Colorado Rockies
On December 3, 2013, Barnes was traded to the Colorado Rockies with pitcher Jordan Lyles for outfielder Dexter Fowler and a player to be named later. On June 14, 2014, he struck a two-out, two-run inside the park home run off the San Francisco Giants Sergio Romo to lead the Rockies to a 5-4 victory. On July 25, 2016, Barnes was designated for assignment. In three years in Denver, Barnes batted .249/.295/.376 with 10 home runs in 703 plate appearances. He was released on September 12, 2016.

Miami Marlins

On December 16, 2016, Barnes signed a minor league contract with the Miami Marlins. He elected free agency on November 6, 2017.

Cleveland Indians
On November 30, 2017, Barnes signed a minor league contract with the Cleveland Indians. He was assigned to AAA Columbus Clippers to begin the 2018 season.

The Indians purchased Barnes's contract on September 4, 2018. Barnes was outrighted to the minors on November 1, 2018; Barnes rejected the outright assignment, electing free agency instead. Barnes re-signed with the Indians on December 22, 2018, signing a minor league deal with an invitation to the Indians' 2019 major league spring training camp.

Minnesota Twins
On August 2, 2019, Barnes was traded to the Minnesota Twins. He became a free agent following the 2019 season.

Cincinnati Reds
On February 17, 2020, Barnes signed a minor league deal with the Cincinnati Reds. Barnes was released by the Reds organization on June 17, 2020.

Hanwha Eagles
On June 22, 2020, Barnes signed with the Hanwha Eagles of the KBO League. He became a free agent following the season.

On Dec 11, 2020, Barnes announced his retirement on his instagram.

See also
List of Major League Baseball players to hit for the cycle

References

External links

1986 births
Living people
Sportspeople from Orange, California
Baseball players from California
Major League Baseball outfielders
American expatriate baseball players in Australia
American expatriate baseball players in South Korea
Houston Astros players
Colorado Rockies players
Cleveland Indians players
Greeneville Astros players
Tri-City ValleyCats players
Lexington Legends players
Lancaster JetHawks players
Corpus Christi Hooks players
Round Rock Express players
Peoria Javelinas players
Oklahoma City RedHawks players
Sydney Blue Sox players
Leones del Caracas players
American expatriate baseball players in Venezuela
Albuquerque Isotopes players
New Orleans Baby Cakes players
Columbus Clippers players
Rochester Red Wings players
Águilas de Mexicali players
Hanwha Eagles players